Head Bush is a 2022 Kannada-language gangster film directed by Shoonya and written by Agni Shridhar, and produced by Dhananjaya and Ramco Somanna under the banner of Daali Pictures, SD Manna Talkies and Zee Studios. The film features an ensemble cast of Dhananjaya, Payal Rajput (in her Kannada debut), Devaraj, Yogesh, V. Ravichandran, Raghu Mukherjee, Vasishta N. Simha, Sruthi Hariharan and Prakash Belawadi.

Head Bush was released on 21 October 2022 where it received mixed to negative reviews from critics and became a box-office bomb.

Premise 
In the late 1970s, in Bangalore, M. P. Jayaraj alias "Head Bush", and his friends Ganga and Samson are called by Devraj Urs's son-in-law MDN to head "Indira Brigade", which was formed to protect Indira Gandhi's reputation. With unlimited money flowing from the politicians and cops, Jayaraj takes control over Bangalore, but petty issue triggers within Jayaraj's gang, which leads into a personal rivalry between Jayaraj and his gang.

Cast 
Dhananjaya as M. P. Jayaraj
 Balu Nagendra as Samson
 Payal Rajput as Reshma
 Sruthi Hariharan as Rathna Prabha 
V. Ravichandran as a professor
 Vasishta N. Simha as Kotwal Ramachandra
 Yogesh as Ganga 
 Raghu Mukherjee as M. D. Nataraj 
Devaraj as Devraj Urs
Avanthika as Indira Gandhi
Prakash Belawadi

Soundtrack 
The music of the film is composed by Charan Raj

Reception 
Sridevi S of The Times of India gave 3 out of 5 stars and wrote "If you are a fan of commercial films, Head Bush has the right ingredients to offer, that if you can manage to sit through the slow first half". 

Muralidhara Khajane of The Hindu  wrote "Despite being a well-written gangster drama that marries a political thriller, poor character writing and execution trouble this Dhananjaya film". Y Maheshwara Reddy of Bangalore Mirror gave 3.5 out of 5 stars and wrote "For a peek into the 1970s, this film is a must-watch".

Vivek M V of Deccan Herald gave 2.5 out of 5 stars and wrote "The makers stay clear of any standpoint. It's also not right to expect the entire truth in a biopic. But is it too much to ask for a team filled with potential to deliver to its fullest?" Shuklaji from The News Minute gave 2.5 out of 5 stars and wrote "Head Bush, as a film and the first episode of a potential long series, promises a lot but delivers on very, very little because the film, unfortunately, is consumed by its own lack of clarity". 

A. Sharadhaa of Cinema Express gave 3 out of 5 stars and wrote "Overall, Head Bush highlights crime, friendship, and family, and makes for a perfect outing for lovers of gangster films".

Controversy 
The film has received controversy because of a scene that allegedly insults Veeragase, a folk dance form of Karnataka. In a film sequence, a character refers to the Dharmaraya chariot as "jijubi" (useless). Sathish, a trustee of the Dharmaraya temple, said that the community is offended by the scene and urged the makers to remove it. He also claimed that the chariot shown in the movie is not a real one, and further offered to provide the makers with actual footage of the chariot.

Notes

References

External links 
 
Indian crime action films
2020s Kannada-language films